Bhama Asakhed Dam, is an earthfill dam on Bhama river near Khed, Pune district in state of Maharashtra in India.

Specifications

Purpose
 Irrigation
 Partial supply of water for Pune city

See also
 Dams in Maharashtra
 List of reservoirs and dams in India

References

Dams in Pune district
Dams completed in 2000
2000 establishments in Maharashtra